Cylindera biprolongata is an extant species of tiger beetle in the genus Cylindera.

References

biprolongata